The men's 1500 metres at the 2016 IAAF World Indoor Championships took place on March 18 and 20, 2016.

In the finals, defending champion Ayanleh Souleiman didn't take the lead from the gun, but ran around the field on the first lap to assume first place by the end of the first lap.  Dawit Wolde, Aman Wote followed and Matt Centrowitz affixed himself to the outside in third place.  At 800 metres (jogged in 2:07.88), Chris O'Hare made a run at the lead, but everybody just sped up and maintained their formation.  With 400 metres to go, Nicholas Willis made a stronger move to the front which succeeded, Souleiman disappeared out the back with the other leaders in hot pursuit.  With a lap to go, Centrowitz got past Wolde for some free running room at Willis three metres ahead.  Centrowitz eased his way closer to Willis through the next three quarters of a lap, making a strong move off the final turn sprinting ahead to a one-metre victory.  From seventh place, more than 10 metres behind, Jakub Holuša pulled out to lane 2 and sprinted around the field.  Coming down the final straightaway he looked like he was in a 400-metre race, dipping at the line just ahead of Willis and barely a half a metre behind Centrowitz.  From even further back, Robby Andrews followed Holuša and pipped both Ethiopian runners for fourth place at the line.

Results

Heats
Qualification: First 3 (Q) and next 3 fastest (q) qualified for the semifinals.

Final
The race was started on March 20 at 14:05.

References

1500 metres
1500 metres at the World Athletics Indoor Championships